Molloy is a surname.

Molloy may also refer to:

 Molloy (novel), a novel by Samuel Beckett
 Molloy University, a private Catholic university in Rockville Centre, New York, United States
 Archbishop Molloy High School, a co-educational, college preparatory, Catholic school in Queens, New York City
 Molloy Deep, the deepest point in the Arctic Ocean
 Molloy (TV series)